Ekalavya (Sanskrit: एकलव्य, ékalavya) is a character from the Indian epic Mahābhārata. He is described to be a young prince of the Nishadas, a confederation of forest and hill tribes in ancient India.

Ekalavya is called as one of the foremost of Kings in the Rajasuya Yajna where he honours Yudhishthira by offering his shoes with respect. Ekalavya was noted as a powerful archer and warrior.

Legend

Self-training 

In the Mahabharata, Ekalavya was the adopted son of Hiranyadhanus, the chief of the Nishadas, who found the former when he had been abandoned as an infant by Krishna's uncle and aunt. Ekalavya's adoptive father, Hiranyadhanus, was the commander of the most powerful king of the period, Jarasandha and Ekalavya himself served under King Jarasandha's army as a general. As a youth, Ekalavya beheld Drona teaching archery to the Kauravas and the Pandavas - the royal Kuru princes - and was taken by a desire to learn himself. He approached Drona and respectfully requested to be taken on as a student of archery. The high-born Kshatriya Kuru princes, who took Ekalavya for a forest-dweller outside Hindu varnas, mocked him for considering himself above his station in life, as a tribal, low-born person. Ekalavya leaves, and then watches from the forest when guru Drona teaches the princes. After they had left for the ashram, Ekalavya collected the mud on which his guru walked, as a symbolic gesture of reverence for his guru's knowledge and footsteps. He went into the forest and fashioned a statue of Drona under a large banyan tree. He began a disciplined program of self-study over many years. Accepting the statue as his guru, he practised before his guru every single day.

Guru Dakshina 

One day, Drona and his students go out into the forest, accompanied by the Kurus' dog, who starts barking incessantly but then suddenly stops. The Kurus find the dog unhurt but unable to bark due to arrows filling its mouth. This was harmless to the dog but prevented the dog from barking. Drona was amazed but also distressed as he had promised Arjuna that he would make him the greatest archer in the world. Wondering who such a fine archer could be, Drona and his students saw Ekalavya, with his bow. Upon seeing Drona, Ekalavya came and bowed to him.

Drona asked Ekalavya where he had learned archery. Ekalavya replied "under you, Guru", and showed Drona his statue while explaining what he had done. Arjuna is incensed and reminds Drona of his promise to make Arjuna the "greatest archer in the world". Drona decides that Ekalavya would have to pay guru dakshina. Readily, Ekalavya offers to do anything for Drona. Drona asks Ekalavya to cut off his right thumb as Guru Dakshina. Happy and smiling, Ekalavya  cuts off the thumb and presents it as Gurudakshina to Dronacharya.

Later life 

The Bhagavata Purana mentions that Ekalavya assisted Jarasandha, when he attacked Mathura, to take revenge of the death of Kamsa.

Legacy 

There is an  Ekalavya temple (Hindi: एकलव्य मंदिर) temple in honor of Ekalavya in Khandsa village in Sector 37 of Gurugram city in Haryana state of India. As per folklore, this is the only temple of Ekalavya and it is the place where Ekalavya cut his thumb and offered to guru Drona.

In honour of Ekalavya, the Government of India runs an Ekalavya Model Residential School (EMRS) model residential school scheme for Indian tribals.
Ekalavya Award is awarded by the Government of Karnataka for outstanding performance in sports.
Eklavya inspires a life-long learning philosophy and his presence seems to be a celebration for the masses. In this EklavyaParv, the motto is 'You Create Yourself" and the legend of Eklavya is a testimony that is forwarded by many thinkers as well. The discipleship that Eklavya represents is the best for a student and enables one to be the creator of one's own destiny.

The City of Taj, Agra has a large stadium named Ekalavya Sports Stadium at Sadar Bazaar in honour  of Ekalavya.

In popular culture
In 1982 movie Ekalavya actor  Krishna Ghattamaneni played the title character Eklavya. This movie depicts the life of Eklavya.

The 2007 movie Eklavya: The Royal Guard featuring Sanjay Dutt and Amitabh Bacchan was named after Eklavya.

See also 

 Puruṣārtha
 Drona
 Eklavyaparv Podcast
 Historicity of the Mahabharata
 Ekalavya Temple
 Eklavya Sports Stadium
 Ekalavyan (film)
 Eklavya foundation

References 

Characters in the Mahabharata
Dalit
Dalit literature
Adivasi
Scheduled Castes
Scheduled Tribes of India